The Nadutheervai (judgement) Ula (journey) ("The journey to final judgement") is a part of Arul Nool, one among the sources of Ayyavazhi mythology. This part tells about the happenings of the world in the end or at the day which Kali destroys.

Ayyavazhi mythology